The 1941 Macdonald Brier, the Canadian men's national curling championship, was held from March 3 to 7, 1941 at the Granite Club in Toronto, Ontario.

Team Alberta, who was skipped by Howard Palmer won the Brier Tankard by finishing round robin play with an 8-1 record. This was Alberta's third Brier championship.

This would be the last time that Toronto would host the Brier. As of 2022, Toronto still holds the record for hosting the most Briers with 14.

Teams
The teams are listed as follows:

Round robin standings

Round robin results

Draw 1

Draw 2

Draw 3

Draw 4

Draw 5

Draw 6

Draw 7

Draw 8

Draw 9

Notes

References 

Macdonald Brier, 1941
Macdonald Brier, 1941
The Brier
Curling in Toronto
Macdonald Brier
Macdonald Brier
1940s in Toronto